Washington Township is one of the twelve townships of Miami County, Ohio, United States.  The 2000 census found 1,803 people in the township.

Geography
Located in the northern part of the county, it borders the following townships:
Washington Township, Shelby County - north
Orange Township, Shelby County - northeast
Springcreek Township - east
Staunton Township - southeast
Concord Township - south
Newton Township - southwest
Newberry Township - west
Loramie Township, Shelby County - northwest

Name and history
Washington Township was established in 1814. It is one of forty-three Washington Townships statewide.

Government
The township is governed by a three-member board of trustees, who are elected in November of odd-numbered years to a four-year term beginning on the following January 1. Two are elected in the year after the presidential election and one is elected in the year before it. There is also an elected township fiscal officer, who serves a four-year term beginning on April 1 of the year after the election, which is held in November of the year before the presidential election. Vacancies in the fiscal officer or on the board of trustees are filled by the remaining trustees.

References

External links
County website

Townships in Miami County, Ohio
Townships in Ohio